Resonate Broadcasting is an Australian media company, operating radio stations across various centres across regional Queensland, as well as Hawaii. Formed in 2008, it currently operates 16 radio stations across Australia and the United States.

History
Resonate Broadcasting was founded in 2008 by Rex Morris and Guy Dobson. The former was the group Program Director for Austereo's Triple M Network, based in Brisbane, while the Dobson was Austereo's CEO. The first acquisitions were of three stations divested by Macquarie Media Group following its purchase of Southern Cross Broadcasting – 3GG Warragul, and 4GC and Hot FM Charters Towers. In July 2012, the stations were joined by two more, with 4LG and West FM in Longreach.

On 31 May 2012, the company acquired three radio stations in Hawaii from Chaparral Broadcasting – KHBC and KIPA in Hilo, and KHWI in Holualoa – through subsidiary Resonate Hawaii, LLC. KHBC and KWHI began simulcasting as adult top 40 The Wave @92FM, and in 2013 was joined by alternative rock 102.7 The Beach KTBH-FM.

After an attempted sale to Watermark Media fell through, in February 2015 3GG was acquired by the Capital Radio Network. On 30 October 2015, it was announced the company had acquired the assets of Macquarie Regional Radio, a subsidiary of Macquarie Radio Network, thereby adding eight stations to their network in Queensland.

Assets

Resonate Regional Radio Network

Resonate Hawaii, LLC

Former

References

External links
Resonate Broadcasting website
Resonate Project Group website

 
Australian radio networks
Radio broadcasting companies of Australia
2008 establishments in Australia
Mass media companies established in 2008